Somatochlora uchidai is a species of dragonfly in the family Corduliidae. It is native to Japan, China and Russia. It was described in 1909 by German entomologist Friedrich Förster based on specimens from Japan; the name uchidai refers to the Japanese odonate researcher Uchidas from whom Förster received the specimens.

References

Corduliidae
Insects described in 1909